Türkmenabat, formerly and since medieval times Chardzhou, (Chardzhou;) ( 'čahârjuy', meaning 'four brooks') and in ancient times Āmul, is the second-largest city in Turkmenistan and the capital of Lebap Province. , it had a population of approximately 254,000 people (up from 161,000 in the 1989 census). From 1924 to 1927 it was briefly renamed Leninsk in honor of Vladimir Lenin.

Etymology 
The former name of the city, Çärjew (also Chardzhou), is a Turkmen borrowing from the Persian čahârjuy, which consists of two parts: čahâr, meaning "four", and juy, meaning "brook". This type of naming is also common in Iran, such as the village Se Juy (literally 'three brooks'). The current name of the city is simply a combining of Türkmen and the Persian suffix ābād (آباد), meaning "cultivated place" (village, city, region).

Geography
Türkmenabat is at the center of Lebap province, which has borders with three provinces in Turkmenistan: Mary, Ahal and Daşoguz. The province also borders Uzbekistan and Afghanistan.

History
A modern industrial city, Türkmenabat's history spans 2,000 years.  In ancient times, it was known as Āmul (to be distinguished from the Iranian city of Amol). The river Amu Darya is said to mean River of Āmul, named after this ancient city. Türkmenabat was the hub in an intersection of three routes of the Great Silk Road leading to Bukhara, Khiva and Merv. . For centuries, Āmul was an important town of the Uzbek feudal khanate (later emirate) of Bukhara.

When the Russian Empire began annexing Central Asian Turkestan, Āmul was surrendered to Russians by the Bukhara emirate, which subsequently became a vassal of Russia and pledged allegiance to the Russian emperor. The modern city was founded in 1886, when Russian Cossacks settled in Uralka in what is now the eastern part of Türkmenabat, naming their settlement New-Chardjuy. Settlement here was necessary to complete construction of the Trans-Caspian railway.

After the revolution of 1917, during which the Bolsheviks came into power in Russia, communists merged the former Central Asian oblasts of the Russian Empire along with the former Khanates of Khiva (Khorezm) and Bukhara into republics on the basis of nationality. Thus, Türkmenabat (known as Chardjuy at that time) was passed to the newly created Turkmen Soviet Socialist Republic in order to reduce the territory and power of Uzbekistan, where anti-Soviet separatist movements were prevalent.

Its role as a railway junction, and the high fertility of the Amu Darya region, made it the major trade center for agricultural products in the northeast region of the country.  The city features food processing, textile (cotton processing and silk) factories. Çärjew was Turkmenistan's industrial and transport hub during the Soviet period, but most of these related jobs and transport opportunities have been relocated to Ashgabat or closed since Turkmenistan's independence.

From the article about Chardjuy in the Brockhaus and Efron Encyclopedic Dictionary (beginning of the 20th century):

Chardjuy is an urban settlement formed near the Amu-Darya station (1070 c. from Krasnovodsk) of the Central Asian Railway, on the left bank of the Amu-Darya River, on land ceded by the emir of Bukhara to the Russian government. There are 4 068 inhabitants (2 651 men, 1 417 women), including 3 501 Russians. There are wide straight streets, enough greenery, many shops, and a rather lively bazaar. Chardjuy is an important trade center, where goods going to Bukhara, Khiva, and partly to Afghanistan, are loaded onto river vessels. The steamboat of the Amu Darya fleet maintains communication between Patta Gissar (Termez) in the south and Petro-Aleksandrovsky (Khiva)... At 16 verst from Chardjuy lies the rather large Bukharan city of Chardjuy (native Chardjuy), the center of Chardjuy province (bekstvo), with the remains of walls and a fortress; 15 thousand inhabitants. Old Chardjuy (Amu-Darya) is characterized by a lively trade exchange. In 1900, 1820244 pd arrived at the station. (military supplies, sugar, timber, building material, iron, flour, tea, rice, etc.); Sent from the Chardjuy station in the same year: 963382 (leather, carpets, sheepskin, cotton seed, cotton - 516641 pd, wool, etc.).

The third edition of the Great Soviet Encyclopedia wrote of the city,Chardzhou, city, center of Chardzhou oblast' of Turkmen SSR, pier  on the left bank of the Amu Darya (where the Krasnovodsk-Tashkent railroad line crosses). From Chardzhou begins the Kungrad-Makat rail line. 113 thousand residents in 1977 (51 thousand in 1939). Arose in the 1880s as a Russian fortification on the territory of the Khanate of Bukhara. From 1886 the city, named New Chardzou, was a commercial and transportation hub of Central  Asia (in 1888 the Central Asian Railway came through Chardzhou). In 1918-24 part of the Turkestan ASSR; from 1924 Turkmen SSR. From 1937 named Chardzhou. In 1939-63 and from 1970 an oblast' center.

Climate

Türkmenabat has a cool desert climate (Köppen climate classification BWk), with cool winters and very hot summers. Rainfall is generally light and erratic, and occurs mainly in the winter and spring months.

Demographics

Türkmenabat is noted for possessing its own dialect of the Turkmen language. This regional dialect is a hybrid of the Turkmen and Uzbek languages, which have heavily influenced the area's culture and customs. This dialect is primarily spoken in Turkmenabat and northern districts of Lebap province.

Transportation
 

Türkmenabat is connected with the Turkmen capital Ashgabat and Turkmen port city Türkmenbaşy by Turkmenistan Airlines and the M37 highway. Türkmenabat is also connected by rail to every province in Turkmenistan. In March 2017, two new bridges, one for rail and one for motor vehicles, were opened for crossing the Amu Darya at Türkmenabat. The rail bridge replaced one built in the early 1900s, and the automobile bridge replaced a pontoon bridge.

A new Turkmenabat International Airport opened in 2018, located in a newly annexed part of the city at its southern edge. The capacity of the airport complex is 500 passengers per hour. Türkmenabat offers scheduled air service to and from all the major cities of Turkmenistan.

The city is a short distance from the international border crossing with Uzbekistan at Farap.

Culture

Tasinlikler meýdançasy is a park where people celebrate national holidays.

Türkmenabat is known for its bazaars. The largest bazaar is "World Bazaar". Other well-known bazaars are Gök bazar (Green Bazaar) and Merkezi bazar (Central Bazaar). People throughout the country come to Türkmenabat to purchase local, Chinese, Turkish, Uzbek and Russian goods. Dünýa bazar has many sections, including those for jewelry, home appliances, clothes, dairy products, and automobiles.
 
During the summer, youth gather at Zaton to relax.

Education
Türkmenabat has one state-owned pedagogical university,  adyndaky Türkmen Döwlet Mugallymçylyk Instituty; a medical college, public schools, and specialised art and sports schools.

International relations

 İzmir, Turkey (1994) 
 Rizhao, China (2014)

References
Footnotes

Notes

External links

Populated places along the Silk Road
Populated places in Lebap Region
Districts of Turkmenistan